is a Japanese football player for Yokohama FC from 2023.

Career
After inheriting no. 26 in Gunma due to Yusuke Segawa leaving for Omiya Ardija, Takai joined Thespakusatsu Gunma and debuted in February 2017 in J2 League, scoring his first pro-goal just one week later against Shonan Bellmare.

In 2022, Takagi joined J1 newly promoted, Yokohama FC for upcoming 2023 season.

Career statistics
.

References

External links

Profile at Tokyo Verdy
Profile at Thespakusatsu Gunma

1994 births
Living people
Nippon Sport Science University alumni
Association football people from Chiba Prefecture
Japanese footballers
J1 League players
J2 League players
Thespakusatsu Gunma players
Tokyo Verdy players
Renofa Yamaguchi FC players
Yokohama FC players
Association football midfielders